Natalia Weronika Szroeder (born 20 April 1995) is a Polish singer-songwriter and TV presenter. She is most known for her works with rapper Liber, of which she appeared with in his songs Wszystkiego na raz and Nie patrzę w dół in 2013. The singer also has a solo career: her debut single titled Jane was released in 2012.

Biography 
Szroeder was born on 20 April 1995 in Bytów. She grew up in the Pomeranian village of Parchowo in a musically inclined family. Her mother, Joanna, is a singer for the folk band Modraki, which was founded by her grandfather Waldemar Kapiszka. Three of her siblings were part of the Rusland Trio. Her father Jaromir was the founder of the Dialogus theater, in 2004/2005. In childhood, Szroeder appeared in the TVP1 program, Od przedszkola do Opola.

In 2011, she was a part of an episode of Szansa na sukces. She sang the song "Cicha woda" by Maryla Rodowicz. On 24 March 2012, she released a video on YouTube for the song "Potrzebny je drech" (in the Kashubian language), of which she wrote , as advised by Tomasz Fopke. In July of that year, she released their debut single Jane. In the same year, she teamed up with rapper Liber, with whom she recorded the song Wszystkiego na raz. The composition was ranked 5th in AirPlay – Top, and also hit the charts of radio stations such as RMF FM and Radio ZET. The song "Wszystkiego na raz" was the second single released in May of the same year in the Liber album Duety. The album also shared the second track of the two, Nie patrzę w dół, whose music video was produced by Cam-L Studio DL Promotion. On 3 August of that year, Szroeder performed a duet with Liber at the Eska Music Awards 2013 gala, during which they were nominated for Best Debut. In the same month, Szroeder appeared on the Russian Song Festival in Zielona Góra, where she performed the song "Kukuszka" from the repertoire of Zemfira. On 2 December 2013, she released her second hit single, Tęczowy.

On 11 February 2014, she released her third single "Nie pytaj jak  (Young Stars Festival)". In April, she appeared alongside  and Dawid Kwiatkowski at the Young Stars Festival 2014, at the HWS Arena in Poznań. During the concert, she sang the song "Za młodzi, za starzy", in a duet with Cygan. In June, she took part in Carpathia Festival 2014, organized in Rzeszów. On 27 July 2014, during a concert at Lata ZET i Dwójki in Toruń, together with Liber, she won in the category of Best Performance for the performance of the song Nie patrzę w dół. In the same year, on 24 August, they released their first single, Teraz ty, which heralds the two as a duo.

On 9 February 2016, Szroeder confirmed on the radio show RMF FM that she would attempt to represent Poland via a national final for the 61st edition of the Eurovision Song Contest in 2016 with the song Lustra. She had been a jury member for Poland in the Eurovision Song Contest 2015. A few days later, she was on the list of artists qualified for the final. She got 5th place with 4.20% of the votes. In August 2016, she released her second single Domek z kart for her debut album NATinterpretacje. Szroeder is a co-author of lyrics and music from the album. The album debuted at the 15th place of the Polish OLiS charts.

From 3 March to 12 May 2017, she took part in the seventh edition of the Polish version of Dancing with the Stars, Dancing with the Stars: Taniec z gwiazdami with her dance partner Jan Kliment.

In January 2018, in an interview with Plejada.pl, she confirmed the beginning of work on a second studio album, which she plans to premiere in autumn of 2018.

In January 2020, the premiere of the movie Jak zostałem gangsterem. Historia prawdziwa, took part in which she played Magda, the wife of the main character. She was the host of a TV program of the talent show broadcast on Polsat The Four. Bitwa o sławę.

Inspirations 
Among her inspirations, Szroeder mentions above all Michael Jackson. She is also inspired by the music of artists such as Justin Timberlake and Rihanna.

Discography

Singles

As featured artist

Videos

Awards and honors

References

External links 
 Official Website

21st-century Polish pianists
Polish women pianists
Polish violinists
Polish lyricists
Kashubians
1995 births
Living people
People from Bytów County
21st-century Polish women singers
21st-century Polish singers
21st-century violinists
21st-century women pianists